Sergey Arzamasov (born 9 April 1971 in Shymkent, Ongtustik Qazaqstan) is a retired Kazakhstani triple jumper. His personal best was 17.27 metres, achieved in the qualifying rounds at the 1995 World Championships in Gothenburg. In the final round he finished 12th and last, nonetheless his highest international placement. He also competed at the Olympic Games twice.

Achievements

1999 Central Asian Games - gold medal (long jump)
1998 Asian Games - gold medal
1997 Central Asian Games - gold medal
1995 World Championships - 12th place, 17.27m PB
1994 Asian Games - bronze medal
1993 Asian Championships - bronze medal

External links
 
sports-reference

1971 births
Living people
Kazakhstani male triple jumpers
Athletes (track and field) at the 1996 Summer Olympics
Athletes (track and field) at the 2000 Summer Olympics
Olympic athletes of Kazakhstan
Athletes (track and field) at the 1994 Asian Games
Athletes (track and field) at the 1998 Asian Games
Asian Games medalists in athletics (track and field)
Asian Games gold medalists for Kazakhstan
Asian Games bronze medalists for Kazakhstan
Medalists at the 1994 Asian Games
Medalists at the 1998 Asian Games
Kazakhstani people of Russian descent
People from Shymkent